Clavier is a municipality of Wallonia located in the province of Liège, Belgium. 

On January 1, 2006, Clavier had a total population of 4,172. The total area is 79.12 km² which gives a population density of approximately 53 inhabitants per km².

The municipality consists of the following districts: Bois-et-Borsu, Clavier, Les Avins, Ocquier, Pailhe, and Terwagne.

The Castel du Val d'Or is an inn with 15 rooms located within Clavier. It dates back to 1654.

See also
 List of protected heritage sites in Clavier, Liège

References

External links
 

Municipalities of Liège Province